Carlos Paton Blacker MC GM FRCP (8 December 1895 – 21 April 1975), also known as C. P. Blacker, was an eminent war hero, psychiatrist and eugenicist who worked with R.A. Fisher and Lionel Penrose. Blacker was educated at Eton and Oxford where he attained distinction in biology under the tutelage of Julian Huxley. He served with the Coldstream Guards during World War I, was twice mentioned in dispatches, and was awarded the Military Cross for action in which he was involved on 15 September 1916. Twelve months previously he had lost his only sibling, a brother Robin, at Loos. Robin had also been an officer in the Coldstream Guards. C. P. felt that war was dysgenic because it killed people who tended to be above the physical average and deterred thoughtful people from parenthood. He was deeply shaken by his war experience and, in coming to terms with it, with the loss of his brother and many of his contemporaries, acknowledged a debt to Freud's writings, which stimulated in him an interest in psychiatry.

Qualifying in medicine in 1925, Blacker became a registrar in Guy's Hospital's psychiatric department for three years and continued his study at the Maudsley Hospital. He later became a part-time member of its teaching staff and was later the first chairman of the newly established Simon Population Trust.

In 1943, on active service, Blacker was awarded the George Medal. The official citation read:

From 1931 to 1952, Blacker was secretary of the Eugenics Society and he gave it a new focus on birth control and population planning. . His appointment as Secretary was "not without some misgivings of [Leonard] Darwin, its chairman. The differences in outlook, aspirations and in judgement of these two men during their partnership in office in the Eugenics Society led to tensions which have been ably traced by Richard Soloway. Two prominent issues here were Darwin's reluctance to endorse Blacker's deep-rooted conviction that research and provision of contraception should be a major feature in the Eugenic Society's strategy to reduce the fecundity of the lower, less able classes and his disagreement with Blacker's aspiration to redirect more of the Eugenic Society's effort from education and propaganda to research and promotion of contraception."

Carmen Blacker (1924-2009), a scholar in the Japanese language and Ann Thetis Blacker (1927–2006), the painter and singer, were daughters of Carlos Blacker.

References

External links
 Codebreakers: Makers of Modern Genetics: the Carlos Paton Blacker papers
 Nobody Better! The life of Robin Blacker 1897–1915

Sources 

 Carlos Paton Blacker's personal papers archive is available for study at the Wellcome Collection (some of the material is digitised and digitally accessible via the website).

1895 births
1975 deaths
People educated at Eton College
Alumni of the University of Oxford
Coldstream Guards officers
British Army personnel of World War I
British eugenicists
British psychiatrists
Recipients of the Military Cross
Recipients of the George Medal
Fellows of the Royal College of Physicians
Royal Army Medical Corps officers
British Army personnel of World War II